John Clevland may refer to:

 John Clevland (1706–1763), British politician, Member of Parliament (MP) 1741–1763, Secretary to the Admiralty 1751–1763
 His son John Clevland (1734–1817), British politician, MP for Barnstaple from 1766 to 1802
 His Nephew King John Clevland (1740-?), King of the Banana Islands